

264001–264100 

|-id=020
| 264020 Stuttgart ||  || Stuttgart, the capital city of Baden-Württemberg, Germany. || 
|-id=033
| 264033 Boris-Mikhail ||  || Boris I (832–907), also known as Boris-Mikhail, was the ruler of the First Bulgarian Empire in 852-889. || 
|-id=045
| 264045 Heinerklinkrad ||  || Heiner Klinkrad (born 1953), a German engineer, academic and former head of the ESA's Space Debris Office (also see Space debris and ESA Space Debris Telescope) || 
|-id=061
| 264061 Vitebsk ||  || Vitebsk, the fourth-largest and one of the oldest cities in Belarus. || 
|-id=077
| 264077 Dluzhnevskaya ||  || Ol'ga Borisovna Dluzhnevskaya (born 1936), a scientist in the Institute of Astronomy of the Russian Academy of Sciences || 
|}

264101–264200 

|-id=131
| 264131 Bornim ||  || , a district of the city of Potsdam in Brandenburg, Germany || 
|-id=150
| 264150 Dolops ||  || Dolops the Achaean, son of Clytius and killed by Hektor in the Trojan War || 
|-id=165
| 264165 Poehler ||  || Amy Poehler (born 1971), an American actor, writer, and comedian who has been nominated for numerous awards for her work on Saturday Night Live and other television shows || 
|}

264201–264300 

|-bgcolor=#f2f2f2
| colspan=4 align=center | 
|}

264301–264400 

|-bgcolor=#f2f2f2
| colspan=4 align=center | 
|}

264401–264500 

|-id=474
| 264474 Rogerclark ||  || Roger Clark (born 1953) made fundamental discoveries about solid surfaces on bodies from Earth to Saturn. He applied imaging spectroscopy to map minerals on these bodies on numerous NASA missions and applied these methods to assess the 9/11 disaster and determine oil leakage from the Gulf spill. || 
|-id=476
| 264476 Aepic || 2001 HP || "Aepic" acronym of the French association of amateur astronomers "Amateurs Espace Pic", which popularizes astronomy at the Pic du Midi Observatory † || 
|}

264501–264600 

|-bgcolor=#f2f2f2
| colspan=4 align=center | 
|}

264601–264700 

|-bgcolor=#f2f2f2
| colspan=4 align=center | 
|}

264701–264800 

|-bgcolor=#f2f2f2
| colspan=4 align=center | 
|}

264801–264900 

|-bgcolor=#f2f2f2
| colspan=4 align=center | 
|}

264901–265000 

|-bgcolor=#f2f2f2
| colspan=4 align=center | 
|}

References 

264001-265000